David Wannstedt (born May 21, 1952) is a former American football coach. He has been the head coach of the Chicago Bears and Miami Dolphins of the National Football League (NFL). He was also the head coach of the University of Pittsburgh football team from 2005 to 2010. He also was a long-time assistant to Jimmy Johnson with the Dallas Cowboys, Miami Hurricanes, and Oklahoma State Cowboys as well as an associate of Johnson when both were assistants at the University of Pittsburgh.

Early years 
Wannstedt was born in Baldwin, Pennsylvania and attended Baldwin High School. He earned an athletic scholarship to the University of Pittsburgh playing offensive tackle and blocking for future Heisman Trophy winner Tony Dorsett. After a successful career with the Panthers, he was chosen in the fifteenth round of the 1974 NFL draft by the Green Bay Packers, but spent his only NFL season on the injured reserve list with a neck injury.

Coaching career

Assistant coach in college 
In 1975, Pitt coach Johnny Majors hired him as a graduate assistant coach. The following year, while at Pitt, he earned his master’s degree. He was on the staff when the Panthers won the 1976 NCAA Division I-A national football championship with a victory over the Georgia Bulldogs in the 1977 Sugar Bowl. In 1977, Jimmy Johnson joined the staff of the Pitt Panthers and the two would forge a long lasting personal and professional bond. When Johnson left to become the head coach of the Oklahoma State Cowboys in 1979, he invited Wannstedt to join his staff.

Wannstedt served as defensive line coach for the Oklahoma State Cowboys for the 1979 and 1980 seasons and was promoted to defensive coordinator in 1981, a spot he held for two seasons. He moved on to the University of Southern California in 1983 to coach the Trojans and served as the defensive line coach for three years. In 1986, Wannstedt became defensive coordinator for the Miami Hurricanes under friend and mentor Jimmy Johnson, where they won a national championship in 1987.

Dallas Cowboys 
When Johnson was hired as head coach of the Dallas Cowboys in 1989, Wannstedt joined Dallas' staff as defensive coordinator. The Cowboys defense was considered one of the best in the NFL under Wannstedt's leadership and he became a prime candidate to become an NFL head coach. When Chuck Noll retired as head coach of the Pittsburgh Steelers, in 1992, Wannstedt was one of the finalists for the job, but was ultimately edged out by fellow Pittsburgh-area native Bill Cowher.

Chicago Bears 
On January 19, 1993, he was hired as the head coach of the Chicago Bears replacing legendary coach Mike Ditka, another former Pitt Panther. Wannstedt's tenure at Chicago was tumultuous. He led the Bears to only one postseason appearance in his 6 years at Chicago and compiled a 41–57 record. After Wannstedt posted back-to-back 4–12 seasons and a 1–11 overall record against long-time rival, the Green Bay Packers, Bears owner Michael McCaskey fired Wannstedt on December 28, 1998, a day when five NFL head coaches – one sixth of the league – lost their jobs. Four of those coaches—Wannstedt, Ted Marchibroda, Ray Rhodes, and Dom Capers—were fired within one hour, while Dennis Erickson was fired later that day.

Miami Dolphins 
In 1999, Wannstedt again joined coach Jimmy Johnson's staff—this time, as defensive coordinator and assistant head coach of the Miami Dolphins. When the then-56-year-old Johnson suddenly announced his retirement on January 16, 2000, Wannstedt was immediately named Johnson's successor. Under Wannstedt, the Dolphins' regular season record was 42–31, with playoff appearances in his first two seasons. Wannstedt earned a great deal of praise for guiding the Dolphins through the first few seasons after the retirement of Dan Marino, but his in-game coaching became increasingly unpopular with Dolphins fans, not least in 2002 when the team stopped giving the ball to Ricky Williams and inexplicably gave the New England Patriots several chances to come back and tie the game and then win it in overtime, starting a six-season playoff drought. Fans were further enraged when Wannstedt, whose contract as head coach also gave him the right to overrule then-Dolphins general manager Rick Spielman on draft decisions, nixed Spielman's plan to take Anquan Boldin in the second round and instead chose a linebacker named Eddie Moore. Boldin was an immediate star, winning NFL Offensive Rookie of the Year in 2003, was a three-time Pro Bowler, and was a stand-out receiver in his 13-year career. Moore was unable to help Miami on either defense or special teams and was gone from the team (and then the NFL) in just a few years. Along with another late-season collapse in 2003 and no playoff appearance that year, Wannstedt became the face of a rapidly declining franchise who most fans and many players no longer believed in.

Wannstedt resigned as head coach midway through the 2004 season, with the Dolphins' record standing at 1–8. Less than two months later, he agreed to return home to fill the head coach vacancy at his alma mater, the University of Pittsburgh. Wannstedt finished his tenure in Miami with a 42-31 record and to date, is the team's last head coach with prior NFL head coaching experience. Wannstedt has served longer than any other coach in Dolphins history except Don Shula.

Pitt 
When University of Pittsburgh head coach Walt Harris was forced to resign, Wannstedt, with NFL experience and a proven college recruiting record, immediately became a candidate to replace him. As a Pittsburgh area native, former Pitt player (offensive tackle from 1971–73), Pitt graduate (B.S. in 1974; M.Ed. in 1976), and previous graduate assistant coach at the university under Johnny Majors and Jackie Sherrill (1975–78), Wannstedt had strong ties to both the university and the city. Wannstedt was initially interested in the job but pulled back over salary issues and concerns about his ability to keep a quality staff. After working out several issues with the Pitt athletic department including pay raises for assistant coaches, Wannstedt agreed to Pitt's offer and was named head coach on December 23, 2004.

Wannstedt said that recruiting would be a top priority under his leadership. Harris had been roundly criticized during his tenure for not recruiting top high school talent, especially in the crucial and talent-laden western Pennsylvania area. Wannstedt retained some of Harris' staff including Paul Rhoads, the defensive coordinator, but made several key changes including bringing in former Baltimore Ravens offensive coordinator Matt Cavanaugh to run his offense. Cavanaugh was Pitt's starting quarterback in 1976 and 1977 when Wannstedt was a graduate assistant coach.

In his first season, Wannstedt inherited a Pitt team that won a share of the Big East Championship and played in the Fiesta Bowl the previous year under Harris, and was ranked 21 in the first AP Poll of 2005. However, defeats by Notre Dame and Ohio University; and a last second loss (by a score of 7–6) to Nebraska kicked off a disappointing 5–6 season that also saw Pitt get humiliated 45–13 by archrival West Virginia. This campaign was Pitt's first losing record since 1999.

Wannstedt's recruiting prowess led Scout.com analysts to rate the Panthers' class of 2006 the eleventh best in the country.

Wannstedt followed his touted 2006 class by bringing in the #28 recruiting class in 2007. The class included blue-chip players such as RB LeSean McCoy, QB Pat Bostick, and OG Chris Jacobson. On December 1, 2007, just days before an upset win at West Virginia, Wannstedt was given a contract extension through 2012; he had previously been signed through 2009. The 13–9 upset win in the annual Backyard Brawl denied the Mountaineers a chance to play in the BCS National Championship Game and was the start of a turnaround that subsequently lifted Coach Wannstedt and the Panthers to a 9–4 season in 2008.

The Panthers started the 2008 season ranked in the top 25 for the first time under Wannstedt's leadership (although the Panthers were ranked #25 in the pre-season before Wannstedt's first game in 2005). Starting 0–1, Pitt soon defeated Buffalo and then beat Iowa with a 21–20 victory. On Thursday, October 2, 2008, the Panthers scored an upset win over the then-ranked and undefeated #10 University of South Florida in a game nationally televised by ESPN. Then on Saturday, October 18, 2008, the Panthers easily defeated Navy. Upset by Rutgers, however, Pitt rebounded with a 36–33 overtime victory the following week at Notre Dame. The game, which lasted four overtime periods, was the longest game ever for both Notre Dame and Pittsburgh. After a 41–7 rout of visiting Louisville, the Panthers improved to 7–2 and were bowl-bound for the first time under Wannstedt.

A loss to eventual Big East champion Cincinnati Bearcats eliminated the Panthers from BCS contention. However, Coach Wannstedt stayed upbeat, and worked with defensive coordinator Phil Bennett to devise a gameplan to defeat West Virginia for the 2nd time in four years in the annual Backyard Brawl. Pitt defeated West Virginia 19–15 on the day after Thanksgiving in a national telecast on ABC. The following week the Panthers won at UConn to improve to 9–3 on the season and clinch a bid to the Sun Bowl. Dave Wannstedt improved his record at Pitt to 25–22.

On December 31, 2008, Pittsburgh was defeated in the Sun Bowl by Oregon State 3–0 in a defensive struggle.

In 2009, Wannstedt led Pitt to a 3–0 start before losing on the road to North Carolina State in the fourth quarter. Wannstedt's Panthers then won their next 6 games, raising Pitt's record to 9–1 and the team cracked the Top 10 in the rankings, their best mark since the Dan Marino led team in 1982. The Panthers faltered in their final two games, however, losing to both West Virginia 19–16 and Cincinnati 45–44 in the Big East Championship game to fall to 9–3. After the regular season, Pitt went on to defeat the North Carolina Tar Heels in the 2009 Meineke Car Care Bowl to finish the season with 10 wins for the first time since 1981.

On March 30, 2010, Wannstedt received a two-year contract extension through the 2014 season.

On December 7, 2010, Wannstedt resigned as head coach, reportedly under pressure following a disappointing 7–5 regular season and having failed to advance to a BCS bowl during his tenure. With his resignation, Wannstedt was offered a position as special assistant to the athletic director at the university. He did not coach the 2011 BBVA Compass Bowl.

Buffalo Bills 
On January 21, 2011, it was announced that Wannstedt was joining the Bills staff as Assistant Head Coach/Linebackers Coach under Chan Gailey, who served as Wannstedt's offensive coordinator in Miami in 2000 and 2001. He was promoted to defensive coordinator on January 2, 2012. He was dismissed, along with the entire Bills coaching staff, on December 31, 2012 after the Bills finished the season with a 6-10 record.

Tampa Bay Buccaneers 
Wannstedt was hired as the Tampa Bay Buccaneers' special teams coach on February 1, 2013. He joined the staff of Greg Schiano, who was an assistant under Wannstedt with the Chicago Bears during the mid-to-late 1990s. The special teams coaching job with the Buccaneers is the first special teams coaching job Wannstedt has taken during his NFL coaching career, although he did manage special teams while head coach at the University of Pittsburgh. He was let go by the Buccaneers at the end of the 2013 season.

Television career 
Wannstedt has been a FOX Sports football studio analyst since 2014, appears on FOX NFL Kickoff Sunday mornings during the NFL season, and was an analyst for the Chicago Bears preseason game broadcast on August 29, 2019.

Head coaching record

NFL

College

  Wannstedt resigned before Pittsburgh's 2010 bowl game.

References 

1952 births
Living people
Players of American football from Pennsylvania
American football offensive tackles
Buffalo Bills coaches
Chicago Bears coaches
Chicago Bears head coaches
Dallas Cowboys coaches
Green Bay Packers players
Miami Dolphins coaches
Miami Dolphins head coaches
Miami Hurricanes football coaches
Oklahoma State Cowboys football coaches
Pittsburgh Panthers football coaches
Pittsburgh Panthers football players
Tampa Bay Buccaneers coaches
USC Trojans football coaches
National Football League defensive coordinators